The 2004 Cambridge City Council election to the Cambridge City Council took place in 2004. Due to ward boundary changes, the whole council was up for election rather than the normal one-third.

Result Summary

Ward results

Abbey

Arbury

Castle

Cherry Hinton

Coleridge

East Chesterton

King's Hedges

Market

Newnham

Petersfield

Queen's Edith

Romsey

Trumpington

West Chesterton

References

2004
2004 English local elections
2000s in Cambridge